"Babylon" is a song by Canadian rock band The Tea Party. It was released as a promotional single in Canada. The music video was shot in Toronto and was unique at the time for being one continuous shot with a single camera.

"Babylon" "was the last track to make it on to Transmission" and features "some of the most distorted sounds" The Tea Party ever made, with Jeff Burrows playing a sped up version of drums sampled from "Psychopomp" and "most guitar sounds are in fact keyboards in disguise".

Track listing 
"Babylon (radio mix)"

References

External links
 The music video

1997 singles
The Tea Party songs
Industrial rock songs
1997 songs